Chalmers Ashby Johnson (August 6, 1931 – November 20, 2010) was an American political scientist specializing in comparative politics, and professor emeritus of the University of California, San Diego. He served in the Korean War, was a consultant for the CIA from 1967 to 1973 and chaired the Center for Chinese Studies at the University of California, Berkeley from 1967 to 1972. He was also president and co-founder with Steven Clemons of the Japan Policy Research Institute (now based at the University of San Francisco), an organization that promotes public education about Japan and Asia.

Johnson wrote numerous books, including three examinations of the consequences of what he called the "American Empire": Blowback, The Sorrows of Empire, and Nemesis; The Last Days of the American Republic. A former Cold Warrior, he notably stated, "A nation can be one or the other, a democracy or an imperialist, but it can't be both. If it sticks to imperialism, it will, like the old Roman Republic, on which so much of our system was modeled, lose its democracy to a domestic dictatorship."

Career
Johnson was born in 1931 in Phoenix, Arizona, to David Frederick Johnson Jr. and Katherine Marjorie (Ashby) Johnson. He earned a BA in economics in 1953 and an MA and a PhD in political science in 1957 and 1961, respectively. Both of his advanced degrees were from the University of California, Berkeley. Johnson met his wife, Sheila, a junior at Berkeley, in 1956, and they married in Reno, Nevada, in May 1957.

During the Korean War, Johnson served as a naval officer in Japan. He was a communications officer on the USS La Moure County, which ferried Chinese prisoners of war from South Korea back to ports in North Korea. He taught political science at the University of California from 1962 until he retired from teaching in 1992. He was best known early in his career for his scholarship on the subjects of China and Japan.

Johnson set the agenda for 10 or 15 years in social science scholarship on China, with his book on peasant nationalism. His book MITI and the Japanese Miracle, on the Japanese Ministry of International Trade and Industry, was the pre-eminent study of the country's development and it created the subfield of what could be called the political economy of development. He coined the term "developmental state." As a public intellectual, he first led the "Japan revisionists" who critiqued American neoliberal economics with Japan as a model, and their arguments faded from view as the Japanese economy stagnated in the mid-1990s and later. During that period, Johnson served as a consultant to the Office of National Estimates, part of the CIA, and contributed to analysis of China and Maoism.

Johnson was elected a Fellow of the American Academy of Arts and Sciences in 1976. He served as Director of the Center for Chinese Studies (1967–1972) and Chair of the Political Science Department at Berkeley, and he held a number of important academic posts in area studies. He was a strong believer in the importance of language and historical training for conducting serious research. Late in his career, he became well known as a critic of rational choice approaches, particularly in the study of Japanese politics and political economy.

Johnson is probably best known as a sharp critic of what he called “American imperialism.” His book Blowback (2000) won a prize in 2001 from the Before Columbus Foundation, and it was reissued in an updated version in 2004. Sorrows of Empire, published in 2004, updated the evidence and argument from Blowback for the post-9/11 environment, and Nemesis concludes the trilogy. Johnson was featured as an expert talking head in the Eugene Jarecki-directed film Why We Fight, which won the 2005 Grand Jury Prize at the Sundance Film Festival.

Johnson wrote for the Los Angeles Times, the London Review of Books, Harper's, and The Nation.

Blowback series
Johnson believed that the enforcement of American hegemony over the world constitutes a new form of global empire. Whereas traditional empires maintained control over subject peoples via colonies, the US, since World War II, has developed a vast system of hundreds of military bases around the world. A longtime Cold Warrior, he applauded the dissolution of the Soviet Union: "I was a cold warrior. There's no doubt about that. I believed the Soviet Union was a genuine menace. I still think so." At the same time, however, he experienced a political awakening after the dissolution of the Soviet Union and noted that instead of demobilizing its armed forces, the US accelerated its reliance on military solutions to problems both economic and political. The result of that militarism, as distinct from domestic defense, is more terrorism against the US and its allies, the loss of core democratic values at home, and the eventual crumbling of the American economy. Of four books he wrote on the topic, the first three are referred to as the Blowback Trilogy. Johnson summarized the intent of the Blowback series in the final chapter of Nemesis.

Blowback: The Costs and Consequences of American Empire

The Sorrows of Empire: Militarism, Secrecy, and the End of the Republic

Nemesis: The Last Days of the American Republic

Dismantling the Empire: America's Last Best Hope
Johnson outlines how the United States can reverse American hegemony and preserve the American state. Dismantling the Empire is suggested reading for CIA personnel.

Death 
In 2010, Chalmers Johnson died after a long illness from complications of rheumatoid arthritis at his home, in Cardiff-by-the-Sea.

Works

Audio and video
 Audio interview March 2010 on Media Matters with Bob McChesney
 Video/Audio: Chalmers Johnson on the military-industrial complex October 4–7, 2008 on The Real News with Paul Jay 
 Audio: Is America on the brink of destruction through imperial over-reach?
 Audio interview April 2004 on Behind the News with Doug Henwood

See also 

 Developmental State
 Japanese Economic Miracle
 American Imperialism

Notes

External links
"Republic or Empire?"  A National Intelligence Estimate on the United States by Chalmers Johnson (from Harper's)
Empire v. Democracy: Why Nemesis Is at Our Door by Chalmers Johnson
Blowback Chalmers Johnson essay from The Nation
Can We End the American Empire Before It Ends Us? By Chalmers Johnson, Tomdispatch.com. Posted May 17, 2007.
Three Good Reasons to Liquidate Our Empire by Chalmers Johnson, The Huffington Post
Chalmers Johnson vs. the Empire, Antiwar.com

C-SPAN Q&A interview with Johnson, June 11, 2006

1931 births
2010 deaths
20th-century American male writers
20th-century American non-fiction writers
21st-century American male writers
21st-century American non-fiction writers
American Book Award winners
American male non-fiction writers
United States Navy personnel of the Korean War
American political scientists
American political writers
Fellows of the American Academy of Arts and Sciences
Historians of Japan
Non-interventionism
Quadrant (magazine) people
University of California, Berkeley alumni
University of California, San Diego faculty
Writers from California
Writers from Phoenix, Arizona